William Hook Morley (1815–1860) was an English barrister and orientalist.

Life
The second son of George Morley of the Inner Temple, he entered the Middle Temple on 12 January 1838. He was called to the bar in 1840 and in 1846.

Morley was a trustee of the Royal Asiatic Society, and during the last year of his life also its librarian. He died at 35 Brompton Square, London, on 21 May 1860.

Works
Morley in 1838 discovered a missing manuscript of the Jami' al-tawarikh of Rashid-al-Din Hamadani, making something of a reputation. He published:

 a digest of cases decided in the Supreme Courts of India (London, 2 vols. 1849–50; new ser. vol. i. only, 1852);
 Catalogue of the Historical Manuscripts in the Arabic and Persian Languages in the possession of the Royal Asiatic Society (London, 1854);
 a description (1856) of a planispheric astrolabe constructed for Sultan Husayn.

Morley also edited in 1848, for the Society for the Publication of Oriental Texts, Mir Khwand's History of the Atábeks of Syria and Persia, with a description of Atabeg coins by William Sandys Vaux.

Notes

Attribution

1815 births
1860 deaths
English barristers
English orientalists
English librarians
19th-century English lawyers